Voieåsen is a neighbourhood in the city of Kristiansand in Agder county, Norway. The neighborhood is located in the borough of Vågsbygd and in the district of Voiebyen. Voieåsen is north of Møviklia, south of Voie, east of Voielia, and west of Møvik.

Transport

References

Geography of Kristiansand
Neighbourhoods of Kristiansand